is a Japanese video game developer and publishing company.
Alvion Group ( Alvion & ULLUCUS HEAVEN ) Alvion is an APP and publishing company.

Corporate history 
September 1996 - Alvion formed.
1998 - Headquarters founded in Suita, Osaka.
2004 - Established ACE, a career preparation school.
2005 - Alvion founded Ullucus Ltd.
2006 - Relocated to Alvion building of Suita, Osaka. Renamed as Alvion Co., Ltd.

Games developed

PlayStation
Circadia (1999)

PlayStation 2
ChainDive (2003)
Poinie's Poin (2002)

PlayStation 3
Malicious (2010)

PlayStation Vita
Malicious Rebirth (2012)

PlayStation 4
Malicious Fallen (2017)

Nintendo DS
Poupée Girl DS (2009)
Poupée Girl DS2 (2010)

Mobile phones
Dragon Tactics (iOS, Android)
Fragment's Note (iOS, Android, PlayStation Mobile)
Fragment's Note2 Side: Shizuku (iOS, Android)
Fragment's Note2 Side: Yukitsuki (iOS, Android)
Fragment's Note2 Side: Yukitsuki Series third installment (PlayStation Mobile)
Fragment's Note Memories -Fragment's Note- (iOS, Android, PlayStation Mobile)

Development support
Anarchy Reigns (PlayStation 3 & Xbox 360, for PlatinumGames)
Ape Escape Academy (PlayStation Portable, for Sony Computer Entertainment)
Ape Escape Academy 2 (PlayStation Portable, for Sony Computer Entertainment)
Ape Escape: On the Loose (PlayStation Portable, for Sony Computer Entertainment)
Ape Quest (PlayStation Portable, for Sony Computer Entertainment)
Bayonetta (PlayStation 3 & Xbox 360, for PlatinumGames)
Bayonetta 2 (Wii U, for PlatinumGames)
Fire Emblem: Shadow Dragon (Nintendo DS, for Nintendo and Intelligent Systems)
Infinite Space (Nintendo DS, for PlatinumGames and Nude Maker)
The King of Fighters Orochi Hen (PlayStation 2, for SNK Playmore)
MadWorld (Wii, for PlatinumGames)
Metal Gear Rising: Revengeance (PlayStation 3 & Xbox 360, for PlatinumGames and Kojima Productions)
Siren 2 (PlayStation 2, for Sony Computer Entertainment and Project Siren)
Siren: Blood Curse (PlayStation 3, for Sony Computer Entertainment and Project Siren)
The Wonderful 101 (Wii U, for PlatinumGames)
Paper Mario Color Splash (Wii U, for Nintendo and Intelligent Systems)
Splatoon 2: Octo Expansion (Nintendo Switch, for Nintendo)

External links 
 Alvion Inc.
 Ullucus Ltd.

Video game companies established in 1996
Video game development companies
Video game publishers
Video game companies of Japan
Japanese companies established in 1996